is a subway station on the Tokyo Metro Ginza Line and Tokyo Metro Hanzomon Line, in Chūō, Tokyo, Japan, operated by Tokyo Metro.

Lines
Mitsukoshimae Station is served by the Tokyo Metro Ginza Line (station number G-12) and the Tokyo Metro Hanzōmon Line (station number Z-09). Passengers can also transfer to the connected Shin-Nihombashi Station on the JR Sōbu Line (Rapid) service.

Station layout
The station consists of two island platforms.

The Japanese folk song "Oedo Nihonbashi" (お江戸日本橋, Oedo Nihonbashi) is used as the departure melody for the Ginza line platforms and the Hanzōmon line platforms in 2018.

History
The station opened on April 29, 1932, as the southern terminus of the line from Asakusa. It became a through station on December 24 that year when the line was extended further to Kyōbashi. The Hanzomon Line platforms opened on January 26, 1989, as the terminus of the line from Chūō-Rinkan; they became through platforms on November 28, 1990, when the line was extended to Suitengū-mae.

The station facilities were inherited by Tokyo Metro after the privatization of the Teito Rapid Transit Authority (TRTA) in 2004.

Surrounding area
The station is adjacent to the Mitsukoshi Department Store and the Nihonbashi Mitsui Tower.

References

External links

 Mitsukoshimae Station information (Tokyo Metro) 

Railway stations in Japan opened in 1932
Railway stations in Tokyo
Tokyo Metro Ginza Line
Tokyo Metro Hanzomon Line
Stations of Tokyo Metro
Nihonbashi, Tokyo